Ḥassān ibn Thābit  (born c. 563, Medina died 674) was an Arabian poet and one of the Sahaba, or companions of Muhammad, hence he was best known for his poems in defense of the Islamic prophet Muhammad. 

He was born in Medina, and was member of the Banu Khazraj tribe. He was gifted Sirin as a concubine. After Muhammad's death, Hassan was supposed to have traveled east as far as China, preaching for Islam along with Sa`d ibn Abi Waqqas, Thabit ibn Qays, and Uwais al-Qarni.

His writings in defence of the Muhammad contain references to contemporary events that have been useful in documenting the period. He was also Islam's first religious poet, using many phrases from the Qur'an in his verses. The work of Hassan Ibn Thabit was instrumental in spreading the message of Muhammad, as poetry was an important part of Arab culture. The work and words of Hassan Ibn Thabit are still regarded as the most beautiful in praise of Muhammad.

Muhammad was so happy with Hassan Ibn Thabit that he ordered to establish and construct for him a minbar-pulpit for him to stand upon when he delivered his poetry. Muhammad prayed for him saying that the Angel Gabriel will support you as long as you preach the message of God and defend His Prophet.

He is also the original writer of the famous nasheed "As subhu bada min tala'atihi".

Life
According to Islamic tradition Hassan lived for 120 years, sixty years before converting to Islam and another sixty thereafter. In his youth he traveled to Al-Hirah and Damascus, then he settled in Medina, where, after Mohammad's arrival, he accepted Islam and wrote poems in his defense.

Notes

See also
 
Hasan (name)
Thabit (name)
Sunni view of the Sahaba

References
 Tabari (1997). Vol. 8 of the Tarikh al-Rusul wa al-Muluk. State University of New York Press.

563 births
674 deaths
6th-century Arabs
7th-century Arabic poets
Poets of the early Islamic period
Year of birth unknown
Ansar (Islam)
Muslim panegyrists
Poetry collections
Khazrajite people
Companions of the Prophet